Results of the 2009 Indian general election by state / union territory.

Number of votes

Percentage of votes

2009 LS Seats

Alliance-wise

Andaman and Nicobar Islands (1)

Andhra Pradesh (42)

Arunachal Pradesh (2)

Assam (14)

Bihar (40)

Chandigarh (1)

Chhattisgarh (11)

Dadra & Nagar Haveli (1)

NCT of Delhi (7)

Goa (2)

Gujarat (26)

Haryana (10)

Himachal Pradesh (4)

Jammu and Kashmir (6)

Jharkhand (14)

Karnataka (28)

Kerala (20)

Lakshwadeep (1)

Madhya Pradesh (29)

Maharashtra (48)

Manipur (2)

Meghalaya (2)

Mizoram (1)

Nagaland (1)

Odisha (21)

Puducherry (1)

Punjab (13)

Rajasthan (25)

Sikkim (1)

Tamil Nadu (39)

Tripura (2)

Uttar Pradesh (80)

West Bengal (42)

See also
 Results of the 2009 Indian general election by party
 Results of the 2009 Indian general election by parliamentary constituency

References
  
  
 

2009 Indian general election
Results of general elections in India